Meme is an indie-pop music project created by producer Danny Burke and singer/lyricist Lizzie Brown based in Minneapolis, Minnesota.

Career 
The couple began making music together after-hours at In the Groove Music's studio where Danny Burke works as a producer and songwriter. The group's sound combines Lizzie Brown's ethereal pop voice and sense of melody with Danny Burke's ambient electro-acoustic songs.  The group has been featured on multiple television shows and movies including Jersey Shore, Gossip Girl, From Prada to Nada, and The Real L Word.

Albums
Meme's first self-titled disc was released in the summer of 2010. Their second disc, Primary Colours, was scheduled to release in the summer of 2011.

References

External links 
 Meme on Bandcamp
 Meme on Myspace

Rock music groups from Minnesota
Indie pop groups from Minnesota
Musical groups from the Twin Cities